{{DISPLAYTITLE:C9H12}}
The molecular formula C9H12 may refer to:

 C3-Benzenes
Propylbenzenes
Cumene
 n-Propylbenzene
 Ethyltoluenes
 2-Ethyltoluene
 3-Ethyltoluene
 4-Ethyltoluene
 Trimethylbenzenes
 1,2,3-Trimethylbenzene
 1,2,4-Trimethylbenzene
 Mesitylene (1,3,5-trimethylbenzene)
 Ethylidene norbornene
 Vinyl norbornene